Fabriciana nerippe coreana is a butterfly found in the  East Palearctic (Amur, Ussuri, China, Korea, Japan) that belongs to the Nymphalidae family.

Taxonomy
Depending on authors, this taxon is either regarded as a subspecies of Fabriciana nerippe or as a distinct species (in which case it is called Fabriciana coreana or Argynnis coreana).

Description from Seitz

In the form [ of A nerippe Fldr] coreana Btlr., from Corea, the upperside is pale yellow and the black markings are thin and sparse, the spots smaller and often obsolescent.
— coredippe Leech (70a) [synonym] is the cleodoxa -form of the large East- Asiatic vorax; as in  cleodoxa the silver is replaced with pale yellow, but the spots are more prominent than in the European form on account of the greenish dusting of the ground between them; Manchuria, Shantung, Corea.

See also
List of butterflies of Russia

References

Fabriciana
Butterflies described in 1882